According to the Wikimedia Foundation, the Wikimedia movement is the global community of contributors to the Wikimedia projects. This community directly builds and administers the projects. It is committed to using open standards and software.

First created around and by Wikipedia's community of volunteer editors (Wikipedians), it has since expanded to other projects, including Wikimedia Commons and Wikidata, and volunteer software engineers and developers contributing to MediaWiki.

Projects

Content projects 
 Wikimedia's content projects include:

 Wikipedia, a web-based encyclopedia 
 Meta-Wiki, a place to discuss and coordinate projects and ideas across wikis
 Wikibooks, educational textbooks
 Wikidata, a shared repository of structured data, accessible by the other projects
 Wikifunctions, a catalog of functions and source code. It is designed to support Abstract Wikipedia, a language-independent version of Wikipedia using structured data.
 Wikimedia Commons, a shared repository of media like images, videos and sounds, accessible by the other projects
 Wikinews, news articles
 Wikiquote, a collection of quotations
 Wikisource, a library of source texts and documents
 Wikispecies, a taxonomic catalogue of species
 Wikiversity, educational material
 Wikivoyage, a travel guide
 Wiktionary, a dictionary

Infrastructure and interface projects 
Other supporting projects in the Wikimedia movement include
 Kiwix, a community project for offline access to the content projects
 MediaWiki, the open source platform for the projects
 Toolforge, a community space for hosting software projects that need access to the cluster
 Volunteer Response Team, community handling email inquiries
 Wikimedia cloud services, a space for shared cloud computing, built on OpenStack
 Wikitech, a community of developers with a wiki and mailing list

Organizations

Project communities 
The Wikimedia community includes a number of communities devoted to single wikis.

Meta community 
A multilingual cross-project community developed on the Meta-wiki, where translation and governance discussions happen. A number of other communities and wikis spun out of this, including Outreach and Strategy wikis, and proposals for Commons and Wikidata.

Wikipedia community

The Wikipedia community is the community of contributors of the online encyclopedia Wikipedia. It consists of editors (Wikipedians), some operating Wikipedia bots, and administrators. The Arbitration Committee (or ArbCom) is a court of last resort for disputes on Wikipedia.

Wikipedians in residence 
Wikipedians in residence are Wikipedians and Wikimedians who collaborate with a cultural institution to help integrate its work into the projects. They can be volunteer or salaried, part- or full-time.

Thematic organizations
Thematic organizations are charities, similar to chapters, founded to support Wikimedia projects in a subject focal area.  there are two such organizations.

Wikimedia chapters

National and regional community groups have incorporated chapters, charitable organizations that support Wikimedia projects and their participants in specified countries and geographical regions.  there are 39 chapters. Over time the agreements between chapters and WMF became more formalized.

Wikimedia Deutschland (WMDE) is the oldest chapter, holding its first meeting in 2004. As of 2016, it had a budget of €20 million. Some chapters such as WMDE get some of their funds directly from grants and supporting memberships. Some others get their funds primarily from annual plan grants from WMF.  As of 2019, roughly 10% of the WMF budget is distributed in this way to chapters and thematic organizations.

Wikimedia Foundation

The Wikimedia Foundation (WMF) is an American non-profit and charitable organization headquartered in San Francisco, California. It owns the domain names and maintains most of the movement's websites.

WMF was founded in 2003 by Jimmy Wales so that there would be an independent charitable entity responsible for the domains and trademarks, and so that Wikipedia and its sister projects could be funded through non-profit means in the future. Its purpose was "... to empower and engage people around the world to collect and develop educational content under a free license or in the public domain, and to disseminate it effectively and globally."

According to WMF's 2015 financial statements, in 2015 WMF had a budget of US$72 million, spending US$52 million on its operation, and increasing its reserves to US$82 million. WMF is primarily funded by donations with the average donation being $15.

Wikimedia user groups
There are over 800 language editions of different Wikimedia projects, each with groups of editors working on areas of shared interest. Some have Wikiprojects with their own project pages, membership lists, and open task trackers.  Some also register as community user groups to participate in movement governance, use community logos outside of the wikis, and receive grants for events and projects. , there are over 130 user groups.

References

External links
 Wikimedia home page
 Wikimedia movement structure description @ Meta-Wiki

 
Social movements
Wiki communities
Wikimedia Foundation